Kahuti is a settlement in Kenya's Central Province. It is located at the junction between the newly reconstructed C72 road and the Kahuti Githiga B road. 
Kahuti is also the home of the late statesman and politician Dr. Julius Gikonyo Kiano who was born in the nearby village of Githiga.

References 

Populated places in Central Province (Kenya)